David Bullard is an American politician who was first elected to the Oklahoma Senate in 2018.

Bullard graduated from Southeastern Oklahoma State University and Lamar University. Prior to campaigning for public office in 2018, he taught history and government at Denison High School. Bullard defeated Erick Wyatt in the June 2018 Republican Party primary for Oklahoma Senate District 6, then defeated Democratic Party candidate Arnold Bourne in the general election. Bullard took office on 14 November 2018.

In 2023, Bullard made news for submitting the proposed Millstone Act of 2023 to the state legislature, which would declare a state of emergency and criminalize gender affirming healthcare for any trans person under the age of 26 years old, with a 40 year statute of limitations.

References

Living people
Year of birth missing (living people)
21st-century American politicians
Republican Party Oklahoma state senators
21st-century American educators
Schoolteachers from Oklahoma
People from Durant, Oklahoma
Southeastern Oklahoma State University alumni
Lamar University alumni